Kaufmannia is a genus of flowering plants belonging to the family Primulaceae.

Its native range is Central Asia.

Species:
 Kaufmannia semenovii (Herder) Regel

References

Primulaceae
Primulaceae genera